Leonardo Paul Alishan (1951–2005) was an Armenian-Iranian writer, scholar, and translator. He was a professor of Persian and Comparative Literature at the University of Utah from 1978-1997. His published works include three collections of poetry, a book of short stories, and many scholarly articles. His translations included works by Nima Yushij, Mehdi Akhavan-Sales, Jalal Al-e Ahmad, and Ahmad Shamlu who dedicated one of his poems to Alishan. He was a member of the Armenian Catholic Church

Biography
Leonardo ("Nardo") Alishan was born to Michael Alishan and Annette Nazloomian in Tehran, Iran, on March 4, 1951. A descendant of the Armenian writer Ghevont Alishan (1820–1901), he developed an interest in literature at an early age. He earned a BA in English Language and Literature from Iran National University in 1973 after which, he immigrated to the United States. He then earned a Ph.D. in Comparative Literature from the University of Texas at Austin in 1978. He moved to Utah and joined the University of Utah's Middle Eastern Studies department in the same year.

He married Neli Assadourian on July 19, 1974. They had three children, Michael, Ara, and Eileen, and were divorced in 1993. He died in a house fire in Salt Lake City, Utah on January 8, 2005.

Poetry collections
 Dancing Barefoot on Broken Glass, Ashod Press, 1991.
 Through a Dewdrop, Open Letter Press, 2000.
 Dead Man's Shadow: Collected Poems, Blind Owl Press, 2010.

Short stories
 Free Fall: Collected Short Stories, Mazda Publishers, 2010.

References
 Lucian Stone, "Leonardo Paul Alishan's Shadow: A Biographical Introduction," in Dead Man's Shadow: Collected Poems, Blind Owl Press, 2010, pp. xiii-xlviv.
 Rubina Peroomian, "The Restless World of Leonardo Alishan (March 1951-January 2005)," in Genocide Studies and Prevention 1/3 (2006): 289-303.
 Obituary, Salt Lake Tribune, January 13, 2005.

Awards
 Academy of American Poets Award
 Christopher Morely Poetry Award
 Irving Writing Award
 Atlanta Review International Merit Award

1951 births
2005 deaths
People from Tehran
20th-century American poets
20th-century Iranian poets
Iranian people of Armenian descent
University of Utah faculty
Iranian emigrants to the United States
American people of Armenian descent
University of Texas at Austin alumni
Shahid Beheshti University alumni
Poets from Utah
Eastern Catholic poets
Iranian Eastern Catholics
American Eastern Catholics
American Roman Catholic poets